Bernd Nehrig (born 28 September 1986) is a German former professional footballer who played as a right-back.

References

External links
 
 
 

1986 births
Living people
German footballers
Association football fullbacks
Association football midfielders
Germany youth international footballers
Germany under-21 international footballers
Bundesliga players
2. Bundesliga players
3. Liga players
Regionalliga players
VfB Stuttgart players
VfB Stuttgart II players
SpVgg Unterhaching players
SpVgg Greuther Fürth players
FC St. Pauli players
Eintracht Braunschweig players
FC Viktoria 1889 Berlin players